Hangul is the Korean alphabet.

Hangul may also refer to:
 Korean language
 Hangul (word processor), a software application
 Kashmir stag, a subspecies of deer
 The Hangul, a fictional car in Speed Racer, the film adaptation